Michael Ratajczak (born 16 April 1982) is a German former footballer who played as a goalkeeper. He is currently the goalkeeper coach for Hannover 96.

Personal life
Ratajczak was born in Germany, and is of distant Polish descent.

References

External links
 
 

1982 births
Living people
People from Herne, North Rhine-Westphalia
Sportspeople from Arnsberg (region)
German footballers
German people of Polish descent
Association football goalkeepers
Borussia Dortmund II players
Rot Weiss Ahlen players
FC Rot-Weiß Erfurt players
Fortuna Düsseldorf players
RWS Bruxelles players
MSV Duisburg players
SC Paderborn 07 players
Hannover 96 players
2. Bundesliga players
Challenger Pro League players
3. Liga players
Footballers from North Rhine-Westphalia